Laura Mas Hernandez is a Spanish contemporary artist known professionally as Okokume.  She is recognized for her character Cosmic Girl, which features in many of her works.

Life and career

Academic background and early career 
Okokume was born in 1985 and raised in Mataró, Barcelona. In 2010, she earned a degree in Advertising Graphic Design from Llotja School of Art and Design.

In her early works, Okokume approached her figurative paintings under the influence of Impressionism. She painted women dressed in kimonos and other Japanese accessories such as oil-paper umbrellas (Wasaga). Her early portraits show her enigmatic style, most notably distorted women's faces with holes, some with pink hair, and turquoise faces with a darker apocalyptic undertone.

The artworks of this period were met with international success, exhibited in galleries such as Barcelona, Berlin, and Los Angeles in group exhibitions.

Lowbrow and Cosmic Girl 
Okokume gradually started to work in a Lowbrow style coupled with contemporary street styles, reflecting her passion for Japanese manga. After the internal dialogue, personal growth, and frustration with the planet's problems, she needed to develop her support mechanism, creating a messenger character who would reach out to all audiences. Cosmic Girl, a pink-haired, turquoise-skinned spirit, conveys the importance of protecting the environment and brings attention to various social causes.

The colorful and cheerful shades of Cosmic Girl and her universe gained international attention, which contributed to the artist's success in the art market after her debut exhibition, Cosmic World in Hong Kong, in 2017. Her popularity in Asia continued to grow in 2018 when Okokume's works were presented together with JPS Gallery and K11. In 2020, she presented her first bronze sculpture at JPS Gallery Hong Kong.

Cosmic Girl Café 
In August 2019, Okokume opened Cosmic Girl Café, a collaborative project with artist Kasing Lung, in Harajuku, Tokyo. The opening of the café was held concurrently with the two artists’ collaborative exhibition, The Monsters, and the Cosmic Stars, in JPS Gallery Tokyo.

Personal life 
Okokume is an enthusiast of comics and Japanese popular culture and a follower of the Ghibli universe. The artist cites influence from Katsuhiro Ōtomo's Akira, which she first saw at the age of eight. Since 2018, Okokume has been actively collaborating with the Make-A-Wish Foundation. She participated in numerous charity exhibitions and auctions, with profits donated to the foundation.

Collaborations 
In 2022, Okokume collaborated with Hypebeans, the prestigious coffee shop with outlets in New York, Tokyo, Seoul and Hong Kong. The vibrant colors of Cosmic Girl's soul, the artist's most popular character, spread throughout the establishment through painting on tables and walls. She also presented graphic material that was used for the design of glasses, walls and T-shirts. An original painting, painted exclusively for this collaboration, was on view in the store.

Due to this great success, Hypebeans decided to take Cosmic Girl to the streets of Hong Kong with its Food Truck company. 

In January 2023, the artist launched two successful collaborations. The first one was with the world-renowned mobile case and accessory brand Casetify. Under the name "Our feelings" Okokume presented a capsule collection featuring cell phone cases, airpod cases, chargers, ipad cases and airtags with various designs of the artist's paintings. It is also possible to buy an exquisite Premium box, with 5 cell phone cases that together make up a symbolic painting. 

In addition, on January 24th Avant Arte (a popular community of artists who support the new generation of artists), launched a limited edition piece of 50 units, "Sumergidos". This is a silkscreen of 12 color screens, hand finished by the artist with acrylic paint and diamond dust, which was sold out in less than two hours.

Books 
 "The arrival of Cosmic Girl" (La llegada de Cosmic Girl), 2018.

Selected exhibitions 
2022 Bon Jour Paris, Paris, France. (Group Exhibition) 
2022 Utopia, JPS Art Gallery, Tokyo, Japan.
2022 Bespoke x Okokume, Landmark Atrium, Hong Kong  
 2021 Reality, JPS Area 36, Tokyo, Japan
 2021 Inside, JPS Gallery, Hong Kong
 2018 The Arrival of Cosmic Girl, JPS Gallery, K11 Art Space, Hong Kong
 2017 Cosmic World, JPS Gallery, Hong Kong
 2015 Ikimono, Open Walls Gallery, Berlin, Germany
 2013 Okokume, Mar de Cava Gallery, Barcelona, Spain

Selected articles 
 Harper's Bazar Hong Kong, 2018
 Hypebeast, 2018
 Milk Magazine, 2018 
 Esquire Hong Kong, 2020
 Diari Ara, 2021
 Ecos de Asia, 2021
 Art and Piece, 2021 
 Yorokobu, 2022
 Trendy Style, 2022 
 El Periódico, 2022

References

External links 
 Official website
 

1985 births
Living people
21st-century Spanish painters
21st-century Spanish women artists
People from Mataró
Pseudonymous artists
Spanish contemporary artists
Spanish women painters